Stereotypes of the Japanese include real or imagined characteristics of the Japanese people used by people who see the Japanese people as a single and homogenous group. Many of these stereotypes overlap with generic East Asian stereotypes.

Common stereotypes

Shyness
Japanese people are often depicted as being shy or quiet, particularly when traveling abroad. Historically, being calm and quiet has been viewed as a virtue in Japan since the samurai period.

Sushi

Sushi is an iconic example of Japanese cuisine. Many foreigners assume the Japanese consume sushi on a regular basis, when in fact it is often reserved for special occasions.

Additionally, because Japan is one of the few countries that continues to practice commercial whaling, the Japanese are often stereotyped as eating whale and dolphin meat.

Media
Japanese media has a reputation for being dark, violent, and surreal. Famous examples of Japanese media include anime (animation), manga (comic strips), and kaiju films (most notably featuring Godzilla).

Japanese variety shows in particular have a reputation for being surreal and overly cruel. Japanese game shows have been parodied on the Saturday Night Live sketch Quiz Kings and in The Simpsons episode Thirty Minutes Over Tokyo. The American television network ABC produced a series titled I Survived a Japanese Game Show based on Japanese variety shows.

In addition, due to its prevalence in hentai, the Japanese are often ridiculed for enjoying tentacle erotica.

Kawaii

Kawaii, or cuteness culture, has become a prominent subculture in Japan, demonstrated in certain genres of anime and manga, handwriting, clothing, personal appearance, and characters such as Hello Kitty. Cuteness has been widely adopted as part of mainstream Japanese culture and national identity.

Politeness
Politeness is a major part of Japanese culture. The Japanese language contains two types of honorific expressions: one to show respect, and one to show modesty. The Japanese often rarely outright reject something. Bowing is done as a common greeting in Japan.

Technology
Japan is often stereotyped as being highly technologically advanced.  Japan leads the world in the robotics industry. Japanese toilets, featuring heated seats and electronic bidets, are regarded as more advanced than Western toilets.

See also
Stereotypes of East and Southeast Asians in the United States

References

Ethnic and racial stereotypes
Cultural depictions of Japanese people
Japanese culture